The Maiden Kissed by the Ghost (known by the artist as Le baiser du fantôme et la demoiselle or Le Rêve ) is an 1880 sculpture by the French artist Auguste Rodin. It was first exhibited at his fourteenth exhibition, hosted by the National Society Salon. One of the marble versions of the work is now in the Museo Soumaya in Mexico City.

It shows a winged man above a young woman, who tries not to return his kiss. The work shows Rodin's admiration for Michelangelo's treatment of the human form and draws on The Divine Comedy as well as the story of Orpheus and descriptions of the underworld by Hesiod. He also particularly drew on lines 25-30 and 39-40 in The Horseman, poem 23 in the 1861 edition of Charles Baudelaire's Les Fleurs du Mal:

Rodin reused the figure of the woman in several other variants such as the Torso of Adele, Eternal Springtime, Paolo and Francesca and The Kiss.

See also
List of sculptures by Auguste Rodin

Notes

References

External links

Sculptures by Auguste Rodin
1880 sculptures
Sculptures of the Museo Soumaya
Marble sculptures
Sculptures of men
Sculptures of women